David Paul may refer to:
David Blackwood Paul (1908–1965), New Zealand bookseller
David Paul (actor) (1957–2020), American actor
David Paul (soccer) (born 1987), American soccer player
David Paul (minister), Scottish minister, Moderator of the General Assembly of the Church of Scotland in 1915
David C. Paul (born 1966/1967), American billionaire, founder of Globus Medical
David L. Paul (born 1940), American banker, real estate developer, and founder of CenTrust Bank
Dave Paul (born 1967 or 1968), American poliltician, member of the Washington House of Representatives